Hüseyin Avni Sözen Anatolian High School (HASAL) is a highly selective Anatolian School (preparatory through 13th grades; although it used to be an English MoI selective school from 6th to 12th grade until 2000),similar to grammar schools in U.K., located in Üsküdar, an Asian side town of Istanbul. Founded in 1984, the school has a history of distinguished scholarship and is particularly well known for the strength of its English language study program.

HASAL is one of the very few public schools in Turkey with a preparatory year of intensive English programme, and one of the few schools with a campus-wide Wi-Fi network.

HASAL is considered one of the top college preparatory schools in the country and has a strong academic record with a high proportion of pupils proceeding to Boğaziçi, İTÜ and other prominent universities in Turkey and abroad. HASAL received the Ragib Devres Award for graduating the highest number of students in the first 200, who chose ITU for their higher education. 
The school achieved some remarkable success in nationwide mathematics, science and sports competitions, including several volleyball, basketball, and chess championship cups in its reserve. HASAL teachers have also received several honorary rewards, one of which was the Ragib Devres Prize awarded to chemistry teacher Gökşin Sumra.

Amongst HASAL's reunion days, HASAL Kış Yemeği, HASAL Bahar Yemeği, HASAL Talaş Böreği Günü and MusicDay can be listed.

List of Headmasters 
 Hikmet Özaslan - 1984-2003
 Hüseyin Yalçın - 2003-2005
 Muhterem Yıldız - 2005-2010
 Mehmet Keskin - 2010 - 2015
 Haluk Değirmenci- 2015 - ...

Extracurricular Activities and Student Clubs 

There are 21 active clubs in the school, some of which are;

Reading Competitions Organisation Committee
Brain Teasers Society
Model United Nations (HASALMUN) hasalmun.org
Dancing
Foreign Languages and Cultures Club
Role Playing Games
PCM (Physics-Chemistry-Maths) Society
Mathematics Olympiads and Research
Scrabble Group
Photography&Cinema (HASALSINEMA)
Theatre Club
 Kissing Club
 Chess Club
 Literature Club
Student Government

Sports at HASAL 
HASAL has competing teams in 
Volleyball
Basketball
Chess
Scrabble
Fencing
Archery
Rugby
Also, the school has the largest in-door sports complex of the Anatolian side Istanbul where students can do physical activities in team sports, gymnastics and fencing.

References

External links 
HASAL official web site in Turkish
School's video presentation on Youtube

High schools in Istanbul
Educational institutions established in 1984
Üsküdar
1984 establishments in Turkey
Anatolian High Schools